Señorita is a lost 1927 American silent action comedy film directed by Clarence Badger and starring Bebe Daniels. The film is a parody of The Mark of Zorro (1920), Bebe Daniels was one of the first actresses to play a female Zorro-like character.

Two prints of the film still exist; one is held in a private collection and another is reportedly in Belgium containing French intertitles.

Plot

Cast
Bebe Daniels as Señorita Francesca Hernandez
James Hall as Roger Oliveros
William Powell as Ramon or Manuel Oliveros
Josef Swickard as Don Francisco Hernandez
Tom Kennedy as Oliveros Gaucho (uncredited)
Jerry Mandy as Juean, Hernandez Gaucho (uncredited)
Raoul Paoli as Jose, Hernandez Foreman (uncredited)
Pedro Regas as Hernandez Gaucho (uncredited)

See also
Lady Robinhood
Queen of Swords (TV series)
The Bandit Queen (film)
Zorro's Black Whip

References

External links

1920s action comedy films
American action comedy films
American silent feature films
American black-and-white films
Films directed by Clarence G. Badger
Paramount Pictures films
1927 comedy films
1920s American films
Silent American comedy films
1920s English-language films